Chasing Ghosts is a 2005 mystery film directed by Kyle Dean Jackson and starring Michael Madsen, Shannyn Sossamon, Gary Busey, Meat Loaf, and Michael Rooker.

Plot
NYPD Detective Kevin Harrison, a cop who used to be on the take from mobster Marcos Alfiri, has since turned good. Harrison is close to retirement when the son of a big-time gangster is killed; and no evidence is left behind. Together with his partner Cole, Harrison goes deep into the New York mob world, focused on finding his killer.

Cast
 Michael Madsen as Kevin Harrison
 Corey Large as Cole Davies
 Shannyn Sossamon as Taylor Spencer
 Meat Loaf as Richard Valbruno (Michael Meat Loaf Aday)
 Gary Busey as Marcos Alfiri
 Lochlyn Munro as John Turbino
 Michael Rooker as Mark Spencer
 Danny Trejo as Carlos Santiago
 James Duval as Dmitri Parramatti
 Jeffrey Dean Morgan as Detective Cole Davies
 Mark Rolston as Frank Anderson
 Patrick Kilpatrick as Neil

References

External links
 
 
 

2005 films
2000s mystery drama films
Films shot in Los Angeles
Films shot in New York City
American mystery drama films
2005 drama films
2000s English-language films
2000s American films